Jina is a commune in Sibiu County, Transylvania, Romania, in the Cindrel Mountains, 40 km west of the county capital Sibiu, in the Mărginimea Sibiului ethnographic area. It is composed of a single village, Jina.

References

Communes in Sibiu County
Localities in Transylvania